Duke Friedrich Paul Wilhelm of Württemberg (25 June 1797, in Bad Carlsruhe, Silesia, Kingdom of Prussia – 25 November 1860, in Mergentheim, Kingdom of Württemberg) was a member of the House of Württemberg and a Duke of Württemberg. Paul Wilhelm was a German naturalist and explorer, who in the early 19th century, undertook several expeditions in North America, North Africa, and Australia. In 1829, he discovered the sources of the Missouri River.

Family
Paul Wilhelm was the fifth and youngest child of Duke Eugen of Württemberg and his wife Princess Luise of Stolberg-Gedern. Through his father, Paul Wilhelm was a grandson of Frederick II Eugene, Duke of Württemberg and his wife Friederike Dorothea of Brandenburg-Schwedt. He was a nephew of Frederick of Württemberg, the first King of Württemberg.

Expeditions
Between the years 1822 to 1824, Paul Wilhelm undertook his first major research trip to Cuba and North America. He kept a diary in which he described the places he visited in great scientific and ethnological detail. An artist produced numerous images of the landscapes, plants, and animals.

Paul Wilhelm devoted himself particularly to the study of North and South America. He spent time exploring the western United States and met the son of Sacagawea, Jean Baptiste Charbonneau. After his initial meeting with Jean Baptiste Charbonneau in 1823 at the Kansas River, likely arranged by William Clark, Paul Wilhelm left camp and headed north with Great Plains veteran Toussaint Charbonneau, Jean Baptiste's father and Sacagawea's husband, hired as an interpreter. The Duke’s party spent five months in the upper Missouri country visiting trading forts, Indian tribes, and collecting scientific data. Paul Wilhelm is traditionally included as one of the first explorers of the headwaters of the Mississippi and Missouri rivers.

As late as the 1850s, he visited Baron Ottomar von Behr, a German farmer and sheep breeder, meteorologist, and scientist living in Sisterdale, Texas. When he visited New Braunfels on an 1855 visit, artist Carl G. von Iwonski made him a gift of six pencil sketches of the artist's Texas work.

Marriage and later life
Paul Wilhelm married his second cousin Princess Maria Sophia of Thurn and Taxis, fifth child and fourth daughter of Karl Alexander, 5th Prince of Thurn and Taxis and his wife Duchess Therese of Mecklenburg-Strelitz, on 17 April 1827 in Regensburg. Paul Wilhelm and Maria Sophia Dorothea had one son:

Duke Wilhelm Ferdinand Maximilian Karl of Württemberg (Schloss Taxis 3 September  1828 – Regensburg 28 July 1888), married Princess Hermine of Schaumburg-Lippe, eldest child of Adolf I, Prince of Schaumburg-Lippe

He and Maria Sophia Dorothea divorced as early as 2 May 1835. After his marriage ended, Paul Wilhelm resided at Mergentheim Palace in Mergentheim, where he kept his extensive ethnological collection acquired during his travels. In Bad Carlsruhe, Silesia, he built the palace, Palais "Paulusburg," but it was not completed until the year of his death.

Literary works
Paul von Württemberg: Early Sacramento: glimpses of John Augustus Sutter, the Hok farm, and neighboring Indian tribes, Sacramento: Sacramento Book Collectors Club, 1973 OCLC 3187671 ASIN B000GR0CVO
Paul von Württemberg: Paul Wilhelm, Duke of Württemberg Travels in North America 1822–1824, Transl. by W. Robert Nitzke. Ed. by Savoie Lottinville Norman. University of Oklahoma Press, 1973 (reprint). The American Exploration and Travel Ser. Vol. 63. ASIN B0006C3UE0

Honours

1831: Honorary citizenship in Bad Mergentheim
1845: Honorary membership of the Vereins für vaterländische Naturkunde in Württemberg

The genus Hohenbergia of the family Bromeliaceae has been named after Friedrich Paul Wilhelm Duke of Württemberg - who travelled the Americas under the alias of Baron von Hohenberg by Julius Hermann Schultes.  The genus Hohenbergiopsis from the same family and Paulo-wilhelmia from the Acanthaceae are also named for him.

Ancestry

References

English
 
 
 

German
 Siegfried Augustin (Hg.): Herzog Paul Wilhelm von Württemberg, Reise nach dem nördlichen Amerika in den Jahren 1822 bis 1824. München 1978.
 Kazimierz Bobowski: "Paul Herzog von Württemberg". In: Das Haus Württemberg. Ein biographisches Lexikon. Kohlhammer Verlag, Stuttgart 1997, 
 Monika Firla/Hermann Forkl: "Herzog Paul Wilhelm von Württemberg (1797 – 1860) und Afrika (Sudan, Äthiopien, Kanuri und Afroamerika)". In: Tribus, N.F. 47/1998. S. 57-95.
 Kilian Klann: Die Sammlung indianischer Ethnographica aus Nordamerika des Herzog Friedrich Paul Wilhelm von Württemberg. Wyk auf Föhr 1999.
 Monika Firla: "Herzog Paul Wilhelm von Württemberg. Naturforscher, Ethnograph, Reisender, Sammler und Museumsgründer". In: Gerhard Thaddey/Joachim Fischer (Hg.): Lebensbilder aus Baden-Württemberg. Band 20. Stuttgart 2001. S. 226–257.

Further reading

External links
 
 Herzog Paul Wilhelm von Württemberg und Balduin Möllhausen 
 Die unrühmliche Rolle des Herzogs Paul Wilhelm von Württemberg am Sandy Hill Creek
 John Cushman Abbott Exhibit Supplement—includes a discussion of Duke Paul and his book Erste Reise nach dem Nördlichen Americka in den Jahren 1822 bis 1824, and a downloadable pdf of the book.

1797 births
1860 deaths
Dukes of Württemberg (titular)
People from Namysłów County
People from the Province of Silesia
German explorers
German explorers of North America
German explorers of Africa
Explorers of Australia
German naturalists
German ethnologists
People of the American Old West
Members of the Württembergian Chamber of Lords